Alexander Scott (25 August 1920 – 12 January 2005) was a British architect. His work was part of the architecture event in the art competition at the 1948 Summer Olympics.

References

1920 births
2005 deaths
20th-century British architects
Olympic competitors in art competitions
Place of birth missing